A. C. Thirulokachandar (11 June 1930 – 15 June 2016), also known as A. C. Tirulokchandar, was an Indian film director and screenwriter who worked mainly in Tamil films from the 1960s to 1988. He also directed a few films in Hindi and Telugu. His 1969 Tamil film Deiva Magan was the first South Indian film to be submitted by India in contest for the Academy Award for Best Foreign Language Film.

Career 

During the making of the film Kumari in 1952, A.C. Tirulokchandar was working as a junior assistant on the sets and during the shooting of this film became a close friend of M. G. Ramachandran. Producer A. V. Meiyappan noticed his talent and gave A.C. Tirulokchandar his break as the director in 1962 film Veerathirumagan.

With the success of his debut film, he got one more film to direct under AVM Productions which was bilingual made simultaneously as Main Bhi Ladki Hoon in Hindi and as Nannum Oru Penn (1963) in Tamil. The latter won the National Film Award for Best Feature Film in Tamil at 11th National Film Awards and also won Filmfare Award for Best film. With this, he became a permanent fixture as director with AVM. He became like the fifth son of Mr. A. V. Meiyappan and became close friend of A.V.M.Saravanan.

Tirulokchandar directed the fiftieth film produced by AVM banner – Anbe Vaa, a romantic comedy film, in 1966 with M.G. Ramachandran in the lead. He directed the films produced by K. Balaji – Thangai (1967), En Thambi (1968), Thirudan (1969) and Engiruntho Vanthaal (1970) which were Tamil remakes of blockbuster films in other languages. He was not only adept at directing social dramas like Babu (1971) with Sivaji Ganesan in the lead, Ramu (1966) with Gemini Ganesan as the hero but also romantic dramas such as Iru Malargal (1967) and Anbalippu (1969) as well as the romantic comedies Anbe Vaa (1966) and Anbe Aaruyire (1975).

He was given the task of directing the first bilingual suspense thriller film from AVM banner in 1967 which was Ave Kallu in Telugu and Adhey Kangal in Tamil. He directed the pair Sivaji Ganesan and Jayalalitha in five films – Deiva Magan (1969), Dharmam Engey (1972), Engirundho Vandhaal (1970), Enga Mama (1970) and Avanthan Manidhan (1975). He directed Rajesh Khanna in Babu in 1985 which became a hit. His other acclaimed Tamil films include Thirudan, Aval, Dheerga Sumangali, Vasandatil Oru Naal, Bhadrakali, Anbe Aaruyire and Bharata Vilas. He was known to co-ordinate the colour schemes of the actors' outfits with the sets designed for the film.

Personal life 
Tirulokchandar had a daughter and two sons, the younger of whom died of cancer in 2016.

Death 
Tirulokchandar died on 15 June 2016 at the age of 86. The reason for death was declared as "age-related issues".

Partial filmography

References

External links 
 

1930 births
2016 deaths
Tamil film directors
Tamil screenwriters
Filmfare Awards South winners
People from Vellore district
20th-century Indian film directors
Screenwriters from Tamil Nadu
Film directors from Tamil Nadu